The Hombron Rocks are rocks awash lying off Thanaron Point, Trinity Peninsula, Antarctica. They were discovered by a French expedition, 1837–40, under Captain Jules Dumont d'Urville, and named by him for Jacques Hombron, a surgeon with the expedition. The rocks were surveyed by the Falkland Islands Dependencies Survey in 1946.

References

Rock formations of the Trinity Peninsula